Vál is a village in Fejér County, Hungary.

External links 

 Street map 

Populated places in Fejér County